The A102 is a road that starts in Clapton, east London, and ends by merging into the A2 road just south of the Sun in the Sands roundabout in Blackheath, south-east London. The A102 was formerly a continuous route including two motorway sections classified as the A102(M), but road renumbering means that it is separated into two sections linked by the A106 and the A12, one consisting of non-primary urban roads and the other a primary dual carriageway south of the river. The route includes the Blackwall Tunnel.

Route

North section
The A102 starts in Clapton at the junction of Lower Clapton Road and Urswick Road. It runs south along Urswick Road and continues east past 16th century Sutton House and into Homerton High Street. It next turns south and runs along Kenworthy Road and then east into Wick Road for a short distance before the road designation ends at the A106 just to the west of the Hackney Wick interchange with the A12.

South section
South of the A12/A13 interchange with the adjacent landmark Ernő Goldfinger designed Balfron Tower, the designation of the Blackwall Tunnel Approach reverts to the A102 through the Blackwall Tunnels and under the River Thames to Greenwich. The road continues south-east as Blackwall Tunnel Southern Approach with flyovers over Blackwall Lane (A2203) and Woolwich Road (A206) before it heads south and climbs the hill to the Sun-in-the-Sands interchange with Shooters Hill Road (A2/A207) where it ends a short distance to the south of the junction as the road becomes the A2 road which joins from the roundabout above.

History
The section of the former A102 now designated as the A12 and the two sections of the A102(M) were all constructed in the mid- and late-1960s as part of the East Cross Route which was intended to be the eastern section of the Ringway 1 (also known as the London Motorway Box), an ambitious and controversial Greater London Council plan to surround London with high speed roads – known as the London Ringways – which was eventually cancelled.

When the A12 extension was opened through Wanstead, Leytonstone and Leyton to meet the north end of the East Cross Route at the Lea Interchange (and prompting the M11 link road protest), the northern section of the A102(M) and the A102 as far south as the A13 were renumbered A12. The southern section of the A102(M) was reclassified as a general purpose road when Transport for London was given control of trunk roads in Greater London in 1999.

References

External links

www.sabre-roads.org.uk - A102

Roads in England
Roads in London
Streets in the London Borough of Hackney
Streets in the London Borough of Tower Hamlets
Streets in the Royal Borough of Greenwich
Transport in the London Borough of Hackney
Transport in the London Borough of Tower Hamlets
Transport in the Royal Borough of Greenwich